Grace-Hampden Methodist Episcopal Church is a historic Methodist Episcopal church located at Baltimore, Maryland, United States. It is a large stone building constructed in 1899. The Romanesque Revival-style church features multiple gables and a square bell tower and masonry construction utilizing local granite with round-arched openings and decorative sill and lintel courses.  It was the first ecclesiastical commission of local architect George Clifton Haskell.

Grace-Hampden Methodist Episcopal Church was listed on the National Register of Historic Places in 2001.

References

External links

, including photo from 2000, at Maryland Historical Trust

Churches in Baltimore
Hampden, Baltimore
Properties of religious function on the National Register of Historic Places in Baltimore
Churches completed in 1899
19th-century Methodist church buildings in the United States
Churches on the National Register of Historic Places in Maryland